Kapoeta Airport is an airport serving Kapoeta in South Sudan.

Location
Kapoeta Airport  is located in Kapoeta South County in Namorunyang State, in the town of Kapoeta, near the International borders with Kenya and Uganda.

The geographic coordinates of this airport are: 4° 46' 48.00"N, 33° 35' 6.00"E (Latitude: 4.7800; Longitude: 33.5850). The airport has a single unpaved runway that is 1058 m. in length.

Overview
Kapoeta Airport is a small civilian and military airport that serves the town of Kapoeta and surrounding communities.

See also
 Kapoeta
 Eastern Equatoria
 List of airports in South Sudan

References

External links
 Location of Kapoeta Airport At Google Maps

 

Airports in South Sudan
Eastern Equatoria
Equatoria